Spring Lake High School   is located in Spring Lake, Michigan, in the United States, in the Spring Lake Public School District, serving grades 9-12.

Academics
SLHS offers AP courses in U.S. History, Economics, Biology, Spanish, English, and Calculus, as well as IB Courses in World History, Biology, Chemistry, Spanish, English, Calculus, and Psychology.

References

External links
Spring Lake High School Website

Public high schools in Michigan
Schools in Ottawa County, Michigan